The term Italian school of swordsmanship is used to describe the Italian style of fencing and edged-weapon combat from the time of the first extant Italian swordsmanship treatise (1409) to the days of Classical Fencing (up to 1900).

Although the weapons and the reason for their use changed dramatically throughout these five centuries, a few fundamental traits have remained constant in the Italian school. Some of these are the preference for certain guards, the preoccupation with time (or "tempo") in fencing as well as many of the defensive actions.

Of especial influence was the Dardi school of fencing with the spada da lato in the 16th to early 17th centuries, which gave rise to the classical early modern style of fencing with the rapier, including Elizabethan Fencing in England and the French school of fencing in the 18th century (which in turn developed into modern sport fencing).

Renaissance to Baroque period 
One of the earliest known Italian treatises on swordsmanship and other martial arts is the Flos Duellatorum (Fior Di Battaglia/The Flower of Battle) written by Fiore dei Liberi around 1409.  Fiore's treatise describes an advanced martial arts system of grappling, dagger, short sword, longsword, pollaxe, and spear.  Another important treatise, De Arte Gladiatoria Dimicandi, was written by Filippo Vadi sometime between 1482 and 1487.  Although different, Vadi's work appears to be based upon Fiore's earlier work. It has been suggested that Vadi's style of swordsmanship represents a transitional phase between that of Fiore and the later Bolognese masters.

A general survey of the 16th-century Italian manuals shows instruction for the following weapon or weapon combinations in at least one published manual:
Dagger
Dagger and cape
Halberd
Lance
Partisan (weapon)
Partisan and shield
Pike
Ronca (weapon)
Spetum
Sword alone
Sword and broad buckler
Sword and cape
Sword and dagger
Sword and gauntlet
Sword and rotella
Sword and small buckler
Sword and targa
Sword for two hands (also referred to as the spadone by some masters)
Two swords
Unarmed against dagger

The most significant group of authors from this time were those from the Bolognese school and it included such masters as Achille Marozzo, Antonio Manciolino, Angelo Viggiani and Giovanni dall'Agocchie.  
However, there were other Italian authors not directly associated with the Bolognese school including Camillo Agrippa (who has the distinction of codifying the four guards—, and —that survive to this day), Giacomo di Grassi who wrote a manual in 1570 which was translated into English in the 1590s.

With the 17th century came the popularity of the rapier and a new century of masters, including Salvator Fabris, Ridolfo Capoferro, and Francesco Antonio Marcelli. Unlike the manuals of the previous century, those written in the 17th century were generally restricted to covering only the rapier being used alone or with a companion arm (such as the dagger, cloak, or rotella). By the end of the 17th century, the manuals begin to take on a more classical character in both the terminology and the presentation of the techniques.

Classical 
Although there is a considerable gap in extant Italian treatises, between 1696 and 1800, we can see from the earliest 19th-century treatises that the style had changed very little during that period.
The only changes were the addition of certain techniques suitable for the somewhat lighter blades of the dueling swords typically used in 1800 as compared to the rapiers typical for the end of the 17th century (compare the techniques presented by Bondì di Mazo in his 1696 manual with those in the 1803 manual of Giuseppe Rosaroll-Scorza and Pietro Grisetti). 
Even at the beginning of the 19th century, techniques for coming to grips were still being taught and the use of the dagger as an accompanying weapon was still discussed (although not as a prominent and popular choice).

By the end of the 19th century, the immediate ancestor of modern fencing had developed with its familiar pedagogy and collection of techniques and theory. At this time, the two predominant schools within the Italian tradition are the Radaellian (after Maestro G. Radaelli) and the Neapolitan. 
In 1883 the Italian Ministry of War selected the treatise by Neapolitan Masaniello Parise to be the official syllabus of the newly founded Scuola Magistrale of fencing (now called Classical Italian Fencing). 
Parise's teachings survive to this day almost unchanged, although many of Radaelli's saber teachings were incorporated.

Contemporary practice
In Italy, the National Academy (Accademia Nazionale) certifies masters in both historical fencing and modern fencing based on careful adherence to the principles of Italian swordsmanship. Abroad, the Italian style is cultivated by professional institutions such as the San Jose State fencing program (California, United States), where Maestro William Gaugler ran a program largely based on the classical style of Parise.

The Historical European martial arts (HEMA) and the Western Martial Arts (WMA) communities in Europe and the United States have practitioners of Italian masters  
such as   Fiore dei Liberi, Filippo Vadi, Achille Marozzo, Salvator Fabris, Ridolfo Capo Ferro, Francesco Alfieri, etc.  
Practitioners include Brian R. Price of the Schola Saint George, Bob Charron of St. Martin's Academy (both studying Fiore dei Liberi),  Gregory Mele of the Chicago Swordplay Guild (studying Fiore and Vadi), Matt Easton of London's Schola Gladiatoria, Ken Harding of the St Louis School of Arms, and Guy Windsor, of Finland's School of European Swordsmanship.

Treatises 
Some treatises by Italian masters:

Medieval/Early Renaissance
 Filippo Vadi, De Arte Gladiatoria Dimicandi - 1482-1487
 Fiore dei Liberi, Flos Duellatorum in armis, sine armis, equester et pedester - 1409
 Pietro Monte, Exercitiorum Atque Artis Militaris Collectanea in Tris Libros Distincta - 1509

Renaissance/Baroque
 Achille Marozzo, Dardi school, Opera Nova Chiamata Duello, O Vero Fiore dell'Armi de Singulari Abattimenti Offensivi, & Diffensivi - 1536
 Angelo Viggiani dal Montone, Dardi school, Trattato dello Schermo - 1575
 Anonimo Bolognese, Dardi school, L'Arte della Spada (M-345/M-346 Manuscripts) - (early or mid 16th century)
 Antonio Manciolino, Dardi school, Opera Nova per Imparare a Combattere, & Schermire d'ogni sorte Armi - 1531
 Bondì di Mazo, La Spada Maestra - 1696
 Camillo Agrippa, Trattato di Scientia d'Arme con un Dialogo di Filosofia - 1553
 Francesco Alfieri, La Scherma di Francesco Alfieri - 1640
 Francesco Altoni, Monomachia: Trattato dell'Arte di Scherma - c. 1550
 Francesco Antonio Marcelli, Regole della Scherma - 1686
 Giacomo di Grassi, Ragion di Adoprar Sicuramente l'Arme si da Offesa, come da Difesa - 1570
 Giovanni Antonio Lovino, Prattica e theorica del bene adoperare tutte le sorti di arme c. 1580
 Giovanni dall'Agocchie, Dardi school, Dell'Arte di Scrimia - 1572
 Giuseppe Morsicato Pallavicini, La Scherma Illustrata - 1670
 Giuseppe Morsicato Pallavicini, La seconda parte della Scherma Illustrata - 1673
 Marco Docciolini, Trattato in Materia di Scherma - 1601
 Nicoletto Giganti, Scola overo Teatro - 1606
 Ridolfo Capoferro, Gran Simulacro dell'Arte e dell'Uso della Scherma - 1610
 Salvator Fabris, De lo Schermo ovvero Scienza d'Armi - 1606
 Vincentio Saviolo, His Practise-1595

Classical 
 Giuseppe Radaelli, La Scherma di Sciabola e di Spada - 1876
 Giuseppe Rosaroll-Scorza and Pietro Grisetti, La Scienza della Scherma - 1803 - 1871 3rd ed.
 Masaniello Parise, Trattato della Scherma di Spada e Sciabola - 1883 1st ed. - 1904 5th ed. 
 Masiello, Ferdinando, and Ciullini The Broadsword - 1889
 Masiello, Ferdinando, La Scherma di Fioretto. 2nd ed. - 1902
 Masiello, Ferdinando, La Scherma di Sciabola. 3rd ed. - 1902
 Masiello, Ferdinando, Trato teorico-pratico della scherma di spada e sciabola - 1884
 Pecoraro, Salvatoree Pessina, Carlo. La Sciabola - 1910
 William M. Gaugler, The Science of Fencing. Revised ed. - 2004. .

See also

Fiore dei Liberi
German school of swordsmanship
Historical European martial arts
Italian martial arts
Spanish school of fencing

References

Literature

 Battistini, A., J. Venni and M. Rubboli, eds. Monomachia - Trattato dell'Arte della Scherma di Sandro Altoni Francesco. Rimini: Il Cerchio, 2007. Print. 
 Butera, Matteo, Francesco Lanza, Jherek Swanger, and Reinier van Noort The Spada Maestra of Bondì di Mazo. Nordkisa, Norway: Van Noort, Reinier, 2016. 
 Leoni, Tomasso, tr. The Complete Renaissance Swordsman: A Guide to the Use of All Manner of Weapons ~ Antonio Manciolino's Opera Nova (1531). Wheaton, IL: Freelance Academy Press, 2010. Print.   
 Leoni, Tomasso, tr. Venetian Rapier: The School, or Salle ~ Nicoletto Giganti's 1606 Rapier Fencing Curriculum. Wheaton, IL: Freelance Academy Press, 2010. Print. 
 Leoni, Tomasso. The Art of Dueling: Salvator Fabris' Fencing Treatise of 1606. Union City, Calif.: The Chivalry Bookshelf, 2004. Print. 
 Mele, Gregory D., ed. In the Service of Mars: Proceedings from the Western Martial Arts Workshop 1999–2009, Volume I. Freelance Academy Press, 2010. Print. 
 Porzio, Luca, tr., and Gregory D. Mele. Arte Gladitoria: 15th Century Swordsmanship of Master Filippo Vadi. Union City, Calif.: The Chivalry Bookshelf, 2002. Print. 
 Rubboli, Marco and A. Battistini, eds. Opera Nova di Antonio Manciolino. Rimini: Il Cerchio, 2008. Print. 
 Rubboli, Marco, and Luca Cesari, eds. Anonimo Bolognese - L'Arte della Spada, Trattato di scherma dell'inizio del XVI secolo. Rimini: Il Cerchio, 2005. Print. .
 Rubboli, Marco, and Luca Cesari, eds. Flos Duellatorum - Manuale di Arte del Combattimento del XV secolo di Fiore dei Liberi. Rimini: Il Cerchio, 2002. Print. 
 Rubboli, Marco, and Luca Cesari, eds. L'Arte Cavalleresca del Combattimento - De Arte Gladiatoria Dimicandi di Filippo Vadi. Rimini: Il Cerchio, 2001. Print. 
 William M. Gaugler, Lance C. Lobo The History of Fencing: Foundations of Modern European Swordplay. 1997. 
 Windsor, Guy.  The Swordsman's Companion: A Modern Training Manual for Medieval Longsword. Union City, Calif.: The Chivalry Bookshelf, 2004. Print. 
 Windsor, Guy. The Duellist's Companion: a Training Manual for 17th Century Italian Rapier''. Highland Village, TX.: The Chivalry Bookshelf, 2006. Print.

External links
Bolognese Swordsmanship: The Dardi School
Fiore Dei Liberi: 14th century Master of Defence

Historical European martial arts
Historical fencing
Swordsmanship